Helen Alliene Shaw (July 25, 1897 – September 8, 1997) was an American actress. She is best known for her roles as Mrs. Dempsey in the 1983 film Twilight Zone: The Movie and Steve Martin's grandmother in the 1989 comedy Parenthood. She was a humorous guest during her first and only appearance on The Tonight Show Starring Johnny Carson.

Early life
Shaw was born on July 25, 1897 in Birmingham, Michigan, the daughter of Bertha Maud (née Crafts; 1873-1964) and Dr. Nenian Thomas Shaw (1867-1952), a Canadian-born physician. Shaw studied medicine at one time and on February 17, 1923 was present in Egypt when Howard Carter unsealed the tomb of the Pharaoh Tutankhamun. She married Loren George Stauch (1892-1957) on April 22, 1918 in Birmingham and they had one daughter, Patricia Alliene Stauch (1924-2018), before divorcing in August 1935, with extreme cruelty being cited as Shaw's reason for seeking the divorce. In her 1989 appearance on The Tonight Show with Johnny Carson she mentioned the marriage as being brief and commented on how couples need to be well paired for one to work.

Career
In 1938, Shaw, along with her parents and daughter, moved to southern California. Shaw became active as a writer and director with the Theatre Americana of Altadena, and served as a writing coach for 30 years. She later took stage acting roles at the Theatre Americana and the Glendale Centre Theatre. Then, at the age of 82, she became a professional actress. Her first notable role was in the television movie Rape and Marriage: The Rideout Case in 1980, which was followed by several additional appearances in film and television.

Death
Shaw died on September 8, 1997, a month and a half after her 100th birthday, in Los Angeles and was interred in Forest Lawn Memorial Park in Glendale, California under the name Helen Shaw Stauch.

Filmography

Television

Film

References

External links
 

1897 births
1997 deaths
American centenarians
20th-century American actresses
Women centenarians